Anisoscelis foliaceus is a species of leaf-footed bug in the family Coreidae. It occurs in South America. It was first described by Danish zoologist Johan Christian Fabricius in 1803.

References 

Insects described in 1803
foliaceus